Stephenville-Port au Port is a provincial electoral district in Newfoundland and Labrador, which is represented by one member in the Newfoundland and Labrador House of Assembly. It was contested for the first time in the 2015 provincial election.

The district encompasses the town of Stephenville and the Port au Port Peninsula.

Members of the House of Assembly
The district has elected the following Members of the House of Assembly:

Election results

References

Newfoundland and Labrador provincial electoral districts
Stephenville, Newfoundland and Labrador